The Church Quarterly Review (now abbreviated CQR) was an English journal published by the Society for Promoting Christian Knowledge. It existed independently from 1875 until 1968; in that year it merged with the London Quarterly and Holborn Review, a Methodist journal and became known as The Church Quarterly, which was published until 1971.

History
It was first published privately in 1875, at the instigation of Richard William Church, then Dean of St Paul's Cathedral, and focused on Church of England and theology issues from a high church perspective. Its original mission statement was "to be worthily representative of the teaching and position of the Church of England", and it advertised itself as "the recognised organ of orthodox opinion for the Church of England". The first issue was published in October 1875, and the first article ("Italy and her Church") was written by William Ewart Gladstone.

In 1920, the Society for Promoting Christian Knowledge took over the journal, and ended its longstanding policy of publishing mainly anonymous contributions as well as its high church associations; in 1921, longtime editor A. C. Headlam gave up his position.

Between 1952 & 1852, the review was owned and published by Paul Shuffrey. Shuffrey was a notable colonial administrator and the son of architect Leonard Shuffrey. Shuffrey edited the Review from his flat on New Cavendish Street, above his father's former showroom. The 1955 edition went to print soon after Shuffrey's death,and was dedicated to its late editor.

In 1968, the journal merged with the London Quarterly and Holborn Review, a Methodist journal (merged from two Victorian journals). The result of this merger was The Church Quarterly, which ceased publication in 1971.

Editors
1876–1879: Arthur Rawson Ashwell
1881: Cazenove
1901–1921: Arthur Cayley Headlam
 1952-1955: Paul Shuffrey 
1956–1969: John William Charles Wand

References

 The Church Quarterly Review archive at HathiTrust

Quarterly magazines published in the United Kingdom
Church of England
Defunct magazines published in the United Kingdom
Magazines published in London
Magazines established in 1875
Magazines disestablished in 1971
Religious magazines published in the United Kingdom